The plant microbiome, also known as the phytomicrobiome, plays roles in plant health and productivity and has received significant attention in recent years. The microbiome has been defined as "a characteristic microbial community occupying a reasonably well-defined habitat which has distinct physio-chemical properties. The term thus not only refers to the microorganisms involved but also encompasses their theatre of activity".

Plants live in association with diverse microbial consortia. These microbes, referred to as the plant's microbiota, live both inside (the endosphere) and outside (the episphere) of plant tissues, and play important roles in the ecology and physiology of plants. "The core plant microbiome is thought to comprise keystone microbial taxa that are important for plant fitness and established through evolutionary mechanisms of selection and enrichment of microbial taxa containing essential functions genes for the fitness of the plant holobiont."

Plant microbiomes are shaped by both factors related to the plant itself, such as genotype, organ, species and health status, as well as factors related to the plant's environment, such as management, land use and climate. The health status of a plant has been reported in some studies to be reflected by or linked to its microbiome.

Overview

The study of the association of plants with microorganisms precedes that of the animal and human microbiomes, notably the roles of microbes in nitrogen and phosphorus uptake. The most notable examples are plant root-arbuscular mycorrhizal (AM) and legume-rhizobial symbioses, both of which greatly influence the ability of roots to uptake various nutrients from the soil. Some of these microbes cannot survive in the absence of the plant host (obligate symbionts include viruses and some bacteria and fungi), which provides space, oxygen, proteins, and carbohydrates to the microorganisms. The association of AM fungi with plants has been known since 1842, and over 80% of land plants are found associated with them. It is thought AM fungi helped in the domestication of plants.

Traditionally, plant-microbe interaction studies have been confined to culturable microbes. The numerous microbes that couldn't be cultured have remained uninvestigated, so knowledge of their roles is largely unknown. The possibilities of unraveling the types and outcomes of these plant-microbe interactions has generated considerable interest among ecologists, evolutionary biologists, plant biologists, and agronomists. Recent developments in multiomics and the establishment of large collections of microorganisms have dramatically increased knowledge of the plant microbiome composition and diversity. The sequencing of marker genes of entire microbial communities, referred to as metagenomics, sheds light on the phylogenetic diversity of the microbiomes of plants. It also adds to the knowledge of the major biotic and abiotic factors responsible for shaping plant microbiome community assemblages.

The composition of microbial communities associated with different plant species is correlated with the phylogenetic distance between the plant species, that is, closely related plant species tend to have more alike microbial communities than distant species. The focus of plant microbiome studies has been directed at model plants, such as Arabidopsis thaliana, as well as important economic crop species including barley (Hordeum vulgare), corn (Zea mays), rice (Oryza sativa), soybean (Glycine max), wheat (Triticum aestivum), whereas less attention has been given to fruit crops and tree species.

Plant microbiota

Cyanobacteria are an example of a microorganism which widely interacts in a symbiotic manner with land plants. Cyanobacteria can enter the plant through the stomata and colonise the intercellular space, forming loops and intracellular coils. Anabaena spp. colonize the roots of wheat and cotton plants. Calothrix sp. has also been found on the root system of wheat. Monocots, such as wheat and rice, have been colonised by Nostoc spp., In 1991, Ganther and others isolated diverse heterocystous nitrogen-fixing cyanobacteria, including Nostoc, Anabaena and Cylindrospermum, from plant root and soil. Assessment of wheat seedling roots revealed two types of association patterns: loose colonization of root hair by Anabaena and tight colonization of the root surface within a restricted zone by Nostoc.

Rhizosphere microbiome

The rhizosphere comprises the 1–10 mm zone of soil immediately surrounding the roots that is under the influence of the plant through its deposition of root exudates, mucilage and dead plant cells. A diverse array of organisms specialize in living in the rhizosphere, including bacteria, fungi, oomycetes, nematodes, algae, protozoa, viruses, and archaea. 

Mycorrhizal fungi are abundant members of the rhizosphere community, and have been found in over 200,000 plant species, and are estimated to associate with over 80% of all plants. Mycorrhizae–root associations play profound roles in land ecosystems by regulating nutrient and carbon cycles. Mycorrhizae are integral to plant health because they provide up to 80% of the nitrogen and phosphorus requirements. In return, the fungi obtain carbohydrates and lipids from host plants. Recent studies of arbuscular mycorrhizal fungi using sequencing technologies show greater between-species and within-species diversity than previously known.

The most frequently studied beneficial rhizosphere organisms are mycorrhizae, rhizobium bacteria, plant-growth promoting rhizobacteria (PGPR), and biocontrol microbes. It has been projected that one gram of soil could contain more than one million distinct bacterial genomes, and over 50,000 OTUs (operational taxonomic units) have been found within the potato rhizosphere. Among the prokaryotes in the rhizosphere, the most frequent bacteria are within the Acidobacteriota, Pseudomonadota, Planctomycetota, Actinomycetota, Bacteroidota, and Bacillota. In some studies, no significant differences were reported in the microbial community composition between the bulk soil (soil not attached to the plant root) and rhizosphere soil. Certain bacterial groups (e.g. Actinomycetota, Xanthomonadaceae) are less abundant in the rhizosphere than in nearby bulk soil .

Phyllosphere microbiome

The aerial surface of a plant (stem, leaf, flower, fruit) is called the phyllosphere and is considered comparatively nutrient poor when compared to the rhizosphere and endosphere. The environment in the phyllosphere is more dynamic than the rhizosphere and endosphere environments. Microbial colonizers are subjected to diurnal and seasonal fluctuations of heat, moisture, and radiation. In addition, these environmental elements affect plant physiology (such as photosynthesis, respiration, water uptake etc.) and indirectly influence microbiome composition. Rain and wind also cause temporal variation to the phyllosphere microbiome. 

Interactions between plants and their associated microorganisms in many of these microbiomes can play pivotal roles in host plant health, function, and evolution. The leaf surface, or phyllosphere, harbours a microbiome comprising diverse communities of bacteria, fungi, algae, archaea, and viruses. Interactions between the host plant and phyllosphere bacteria have the potential to drive various aspects of host plant physiology. However, as of 2020 knowledge of these bacterial associations in the phyllosphere remains relatively modest, and there is a need to advance fundamental knowledge of phyllosphere microbiome dynamics.

Overall, there remains high species richness in phyllosphere communities. Fungal communities are highly variable in the phyllosphere of temperate regions and are more diverse than in tropical regions. There can be up to 107 microbes per square centimetre present on the leaf surfaces of plants, and the bacterial population of the phyllosphere on a global scale is estimated to be 1026 cells. The population size of the fungal phyllosphere is likely to be smaller.

Phyllosphere microbes from different plants appear to be somewhat similar at high levels of taxa, but at the lower levels taxa there remain significant differences. This indicates microorganisms may need finely tuned metabolic adjustment to survive in phyllosphere environment. Pseudomonadota seems to be the dominant colonizers, with Bacteroidota and Actinomycetota also predominant in phyllospheres. Although there are similarities between the rhizosphere and soil microbial communities, very little similarity has been found between phyllosphere communities and microorganisms floating in open air (aeroplankton).

The assembly of the phyllosphere microbiome, which can be strictly defined as epiphytic bacterial communities on the leaf surface, can be shaped by the microbial communities present in the surrounding environment (i.e., stochastic colonisation) and the host plant (i.e., biotic selection). However, although the leaf surface is generally considered a discrete microbial habitat, there is no consensus on the dominant driver of community assembly across phyllosphere microbiomes. For example, host-specific bacterial communities have been reported in the phyllosphere of co-occurring plant species, suggesting a dominant role of host selection. 

Conversely, microbiomes of the surrounding environment have also been reported to be the primary determinant of phyllosphere community composition. As a result, the processes that drive phyllosphere community assembly are not well understood but unlikely to be universal across plant species. However, the existing evidence does indicate that phyllosphere microbiomes exhibiting host-specific associations are more likely to interact with the host than those primarily recruited from the surrounding environment.

The search for a core microbiome in host-associated microbial communities is a useful first step in trying to understand the interactions that may be occurring between a host and its microbiome. The prevailing core microbiome concept is built on the notion that the persistence of a taxon across the spatiotemporal boundaries of an ecological niche is directly reflective of its functional importance within the niche it occupies; it therefore provides a framework for identifying functionally critical microorganisms that consistently associate with a host species. 

Divergent definitions of “core microbiome” have arisen across scientific literature with researchers variably identifying “core taxa” as those persistent across distinct host microhabitats and even different species. Given the functional divergence of microorganisms across different host species and microhabitats, defining core taxa sensu stricto as those persistent across broad geographic distances within tissue- and species-specific host microbiomes, represents the most biologically and ecologically appropriate application of this conceptual framework. Tissue- and species-specific core microbiomes across host populations separated by broad geographical distances have not been widely reported for the phyllosphere using the stringent definition established by Ruinen.

Example: The mānuka phyllosphere
The  flowering tea tree commonly known as mānuka is indigenous to New Zealand. Mānuka honey, produced from the nectar of mānuka flowers, is known for its non-peroxide antibacterial properties. Microorganisms have been studied in the mānuka rhizosphere and endosphere. Earlier studies primarily focussed on fungi, and a 2016 study provided the first investigation of endophytic bacterial communities from three geographically and environmentally distinct mānuka populations using fingerprinting techniques and revealed tissue-specific core endomicrobiomes.

A 2020 study identified a habitat-specific and relatively abundant core microbiome in the mānuka phyllosphere, which was persistent across all samples. In contrast, non-core phyllosphere microorganisms exhibited significant variation across individual host trees and populations that was strongly driven by environmental and spatial factors. The results demonstrated the existence of a dominant and ubiquitous core microbiome in the phyllosphere of mānuka.

Endosphere microbiome

Some microorganisms, such as endophytes, penetrate and occupy the plant internal tissues, forming the endospheric microbiome. The arbuscular mycorrhizal and other endophytic fungi are the dominant colonizers of the endosphere. Bacteria, and to some degree archaea, are important members of endosphere communities. Some of these endophytic microbes interact with their host and provide obvious benefits to plants. Unlike the rhizosphere and the rhizoplane, the endospheres harbor highly specific microbial communities. The root endophytic community can be very distinct from that of the adjacent soil community. In general, diversity of the endophytic community is lower than the diversity of the microbial community outside the plant. The identity and diversity of the endophytic microbiome of above-and below-ground tissues may also differ within the plant.

The seed microbiome 

Individual seeds possessed high microbial diversity, that was higher in the embryo than in the pericarp. Plant seeds can serve as natural vectors for vertical transmission of beneficial endophytes that confer disease resistance. Evidence showing the transmission of microorganisms from seeds to the developing seedling, was found to occur in experimental and natural conditions. It also seems that the transmission to new plant happens through specific mechanisms where certain microorganisms migrate from seed to plant leaves and other to plant roots.

Plant holobiont

Since the colonization of land by ancestral plant lineages 450 million years ago, plants and their associated microbes have been interacting with each other, forming an assemblage of species that is often referred to as a holobiont. Selective pressure acting on holobiont components has likely shaped plant-associated microbial communities and selected for host-adapted microorganisms that impact plant fitness. However, the high microbial densities detected on plant tissues, together with the fast generation time of microbes and their more ancient origin compared to their host, suggest that microbe-microbe interactions are also important selective forces sculpting complex microbial assemblages in the phyllosphere, rhizosphere, and plant endosphere compartments.

See also
 Biomass partitioning
 Mangrove microbiome
 Phytobiome

References

Reference books
 Saleem M (2015) Microbiome Community Ecology: Fundamentals and Applications Springer. .
 Kumar V, Prasad R, Kumar M and Choudhary DK (2019) Microbiome in Plant Health and Disease: Challenges and Opportunities Springer. .

 

 

 

 

 

 

 

 

 

 
 

 

 

 

 

Microbiomes
Plants